Stigmatoptera is a genus of moths in the family Gelechiidae. It contains the species Stigmatoptera dumonti, which is found in Tunisia.

References

Gelechiinae